Patrizia Barucha (born 7 April 1983) is a retired German football striker.

She won the 2005–06 UEFA Women's Cup with 1. FFC Frankfurt. She was also a squad member for the 2002 UEFA Women's Under-19 Championship.

References

1983 births
Living people
German women's footballers
FSV Frankfurt players
1. FFC Frankfurt players
Frauen-Bundesliga players
Women's association football forwards